North Wellington AFC is association football club based in the northern suburbs of Wellington, New Zealand. They currently compete in the Central Premier League.

History

Early history
It was founded in 1972 as an amalgamation of the Onslow (founded 1934) & Johnson Villa (1951) clubs with the club colours of sky blue & claret originating from the Johnson Villa (and the approach to Aston Villa FC, England to use their colours). In 1992 Newlands-Paparangi United (1968) folded and was merged within the club. The 2 local junior football clubs (Onslow Junior Football & North Wellington Junior Football) are affiliated to the club.

The club entered 19 (15 men & 4 women) teams in senior football in the Capital Football leagues for the 2014 season (21 in 2013), which commenced in early April and concluded on 31 August. The club's home ground is Alex Moore Park, Johnsonville, Wellington, a ground it shares with Johnsonville Softball Club. The men's senior team currently plays in the Capital One League, immediately below the Capital Premier League. The team played in the Central Premier League and its predecessors in 1992-2000 and 2005–2006, finishing second in 1996. North Wellington's best performance in the Chatham Cup came in 1997, when they reached the quarter-finals before losing to Mount Wellington 3-2. The following season they reached the fifth round (last 16 stage). Johnson Villa had previously reached the fourth round (last 32 stage) in 1970, as had Newlands-Paparangi in 1975.

2010s
For the 2013 season the club appointed Stephen Maclaren (to replace Iain MacIntyre) as coach of the Men's senior team which finished in 8th place of the 10-team Capital One league (which led to their relegation to Capital Two, however Capital Football Board decision re-instated the team in the 2014 Capital One league due to issues arising from a final round game involving Brooklyn and Miramar Rangers (which went to NZ Football level)). They finished in 4th place of the 10-team 2012 Capital One league, despite a latter season run of 9 wins in 10 games, and lost 2-0 in the 1st round of the Chatham Cup against Central league side Miramar Rangers who reached the semi-final stage. The club is also one of 5 local sports clubs working towards the development of a new clubroom facility on Alex Moore Park (resource consent granted in mid-2013 and the building timeframe scheduled for 3–5 years. The estimated project cost (as at April 2014) is $5m, and will benefit from the construction of an artificial playing surface on the lower level of Alex Moore Park (a Wellington City Council project which was officially opened by the Wellington City Council on Saturday 17 May 2014).

In the 2014 season the Men's senior team had a change of coach on 15 May with Stephen Maclaren resigning, after 4 league games in the Capital One League. The team finished in 3rd place of the 11 teams, narrowly missing promotion, with a season record of 14 wins, 1 draw and 5 losses. The Chatham Cup 1st round fixture (North Wellington 0 Wellington Olympic 12) on 10 May was the Club's 80th in this national club knock-out competition. The Women's senior team is coached by Darren Rewi in the Women's Premier League, and the team finished in 8th place of 8 teams with a season record of 0 wins, 1 draw and 13 losses.

The club currently play in the Capital Premier division, the highest Wellington only division.

Note: The club is not connected with the former team Wellington Northern, which is now part of Brooklyn Northern United.

References
Club website
Club website (Older WCC-provided)
UltimateNZSoccer website North Wellington page

Association football clubs in Wellington
Sport in Wellington City
1972 establishments in New Zealand